Smith v. Commissioner, 40 B.T.A. 1038 (1939) is a United States tax case discussing the boundaries of tax deductibility.

HELD:
Cost of hiring nursemaids to care for the infant child of a couple, both of whom are employed, not deductible as an ordinary and necessary business expense of the wife.

Academic commentary
The Smith decision demonstrates that it is the basic terms of existence of a person already at work that mark the boundary between business and personal expense.

Facts

Judgment

The following is a quotation from the body of the court's judgment:

References

United States taxation and revenue case law
1939 in United States case law
United States Tax Court cases